Arso may refer to:
 Arso Jovanović (1907–1948), Yugoslav partisan general during World War II
 Arso, Keerom, a district in Papua, Indonesia
 Arso Airport
 Slovenian Environment Agency ( or ARSO)